Chandrasekhar Nataraj (ಚಂ. ನಟರಾಜ.) (1959),  an American-Indian scientist, and Professor in the Mechanical Engineering Department at Villanova University, where he holds the Mr. and Mrs. Robert F. Moritz, Sr. Endowed Chair position in Engineered Systems.

His research includes nonlinear dynamic systems with applications to machinery diagnostics, rotor dynamics, vibration, control, electromagnetic bearings, mobile robotics, unmanned vehicles and biomedical diagnostics. He is currently the editor-in-chief of the Journal of Vibration Engineering & Technologies, and associate editor of Nonlinear Dynamics.

Education 

Nataraj received a Bachelor of Science degree in mechanical engineering from Indian Institute of Technology in 1982. He then received his M.Sc degree in mechanical engineering from Arizona State University in 1984 for his research on “The Simulation of Cracked Shaft Dynamics” followed by a PhD degree in engineering science in 1987 for his research on “Periodic Solution in Nonlinear Mechanical Systems,” supervised by Professor Harold D. Nelson at Arizona State.

Career 

Nataraj was hired as a research engineer in the department of mechanical engineering at Villanova in 1988. In 2004 he became a full professor, and the director of the Center for Nonlinear Dynamics and Control (CENDAC). In 2007 Nataraj was elected chair of department of mechanical engineering.

Research 

Nataraj has founded and established two major research centers in the college of engineering at Villanova University. He served as founding director of CENDAC, an interdisciplinary research center which was founded in 2003. More recently Nataraj has founded the Villanova Center for Analytics of Dynamic Systems (VCADS)

, which focuses on interdisciplinary research in data analytics, diagnostics and predictive modeling.
Nataraj's research in unmanned boats and surface vehicles has been recognized nationally and internationally. He was leading one of only three teams from the USA that participated in the highly selective international maritime RobotX challenge.

Nataraj is an author of two text books, 60+ articles in peer-reviewed technical journals and books, and 100+ conference proceedings.

Awards and recognition 

Nataraj was elected member of the Bower Medal Preselection Committee, Franklin Institute, 2007. He is the winner of 2013 Villanova University the outstanding faculty research award. He serves on several international committees, including ASME’s Technical Committee on Vibration & Sound, the International Federation for the Promotion of Mechanism and Machine Science (IFToMM) Committee, and the Committee for Science and the Arts at the Franklin Institute.

References 

1959 births
Living people
American people of Indian descent
Arizona State University alumni
Indian Institutes of Technology alumni
Villanova University faculty